Alfonso Beretta P.I.M.E. (26 December 1911 – 23 May 1998, Alfonso Beretta) was an Italian Bishop of Warangal.

Life
Beretta was born in Brugherio in 1911 on Boxing Day. He was ordained as a priest on 22 September 1934 as a priest of the Pontifical Institute for Foreign Missions. He was appointed	Bishop of the Roman Catholic Diocese of Hyderabad, India on 23 Dec 1950 and consecrated on 8 April 1951. He was appointed to be the Bishop of Warangal in India on 8 Jan 1953.

Beretta retired on 30 November 1985 and he died in Warangal in 1998 as the Bishop Emeritus of Warangal.

References

1911 births
1998 deaths
People from Brugherio
Italian Roman Catholic missionaries
20th-century Roman Catholic bishops in India